Rea Brändle (1 May 1953 in Neu St. Johann, canton of St. Gallen – 2 September 2019 in Zurich) was a Swiss journalist and writer.

Biography
Brändle grew up in upper Toggenburg. After she completed her German studies, she became a cultural editor and journalist for Tages-Anzeiger. In 1984, she contributed to the publication of the booklet  Die Sprache ist kein Mann, Madame of the women's group of the Swiss Journalists Union. Later she became an independent author. In 2012, she edited a biography of writer Alfred Huggenberger with historian Mario König on behalf of the government of Thurgau. For several years, she wrote regularly for WOZ Die Wochenzeitung in Zurich. In 2006, she contributed to WOZ as a cultural editor.

Publications
Books
 Johannes Seluner, Findling. Eine Recherche. Zurich: Limmat, 1990, .
 Wildfremd, hautnah. Völkerschauen und Schauplätze Zürich 1880–1960. Zurich: Rotpunkt, 1995, . 2nd edition, reworked and enlarged: Zurich, Rotpunkt, 2013, 
 with Felix Kauf and Ernst Scagnet: Die Regierung & Partner. Total verrückte Geschichte einer ganz normalen Entwicklung. Wattwil, Toggenburger, 2004, .
 200 Jahre Theater St. Gallen (ed.). Basel, Theaterkulturverlag, 2005,  (= Schweizer Theaterjahrbuch, vol. 66).
 Über Giuseppe Reichmuth. Was macht einer mit so viel Talent. Zurich, Offizin, 2006, .
 Nayo Bruce. Geschichte einer afrikanischen Familie in Europa. Zurich, Chronos, 2007, .
 Ammanns Vermächtnis. Aus dem Leben des Toggenburger Instrumentenmachers Ulrich Ammann, 1766–1842. Wattwil, Toggenburger, 2010, .
 with Mario König: Huggenberger. Die Karriere eines Schriftstellers. Frauenfeld: Verlag des Historischen Vereins des Kantons Thurgau, 2012, .

Theatre works
 Ammanns Vermächtnis. UA: Alt St. Johann, 2002
 Herr Stauss malt an einem Bild und unser Haus ist auch drauf. UA: Lichtensteig, 2009

Film, TV
 Emil Zbinden (with Karl Jost and Peter Münger)
 Johannes Seluner, Fernsehen DRS, 1994

References

External links
 
 

Swiss women journalists
20th-century Swiss journalists
21st-century Swiss journalists
Swiss newspaper journalists
Swiss newspaper editors
Swiss women editors
20th-century Swiss women writers
21st-century Swiss women writers
Swiss dramatists and playwrights
Swiss women dramatists and playwrights
21st-century dramatists and playwrights
Swiss essayists
Swiss women essayists
20th-century essayists
21st-century essayists
People from Toggenburg
1953 births
2019 deaths